H-89 is a protein kinase inhibitor with greatest effect on protein kinase A (PKA). H-89, derived from H-8 (N-[2-(methylamino)ethyl]-5-isoquinoline-sulfonamide), was initially believed to act specifically as an inhibitor of PKA, being 30 times more potent than H-8 at inhibiting PKA and 10 times less potent at inhibiting protein kinase G.  It achieves this through competitive inhibition of the adenosine triphosphate (ATP) site on the PKA catalytic subunit.  However, subsequent work has suggested a variety of additional effects such as inhibition of other protein kinases (IC50 values of 80, 120, 135, 270, 2600 and 2800 nM for S6K1, MSK1, PKA, ROCKII, PKBα and MAPKAP-K1b respectively), and direct inhibition of various potassium currents.

In addition to its use in studying mechanisms of cell signalling, H-89 has also been used experimentally in vivo.  H-89 has been shown to increase the threshold and latency of pentylenetetrazol-induced seizures  and decrease morphine withdrawal symptoms in mice.

References

Isoquinolines
Organobromides
Sulfonamides
Protein kinase inhibitors